Todupunuri Amarnath Goud (born 1 March 1965) is an Indian Judge of Tripura High Court. He is former Judge of Telangana High Court.

Early life and education 
He studied at the St. Patrick's High School, Secunderabad.

References 

Indian judges
1965 births
Living people